This is a list of universities in Malawi.

Public universities 
 Lilongwe University of Agriculture and Natural Resources 
 Malawi University of Science and Technology
 Mzuzu University
 University of Malawi 
 University of Malawi College of Medicine
 
 Malawi College of Health Sciences
 Malawi University of Business and Applied Sciences - MUBAS (formerly The Polytechnic College)

Private universities 
 Catholic University of Malawi
 Malawi Adventist University
 UNICAF 
 
 Blantyre International University - BIU
 Daeyang University
 DMI-St. John the Baptist University
 Exploits University
 Jubilee University
 Lake Malawi Anglican University
 Millenium University
 Nkhoma University
 Pentecostal Life University
 ShareWorld Open University Malawi (SOUMA)
 University of Lilongwe - UniLil
 University of Livingstonia

References

Malawi
Universities
Malawi